Aaron Addison (born 12 November 1995) is an Australian tennis player.

Addison has a career high ATP singles ranking of 990 achieved on 26 August 2019. He also has a career high ATP doubles ranking of 829 achieved on 12 August 2019.

Addison made his ATP main draw debut at the 2022 Adelaide International 2 after receiving a wildcard into the doubles main draw with Thomas Fancutt.

Career

2012-2021: ITF debut
Addison made ITF debut playing doubles in October 2012 at the Australia F12.

Addison made ITF singles debut in September 2014 at the Australia F6.

In February 2017, Addison won his first ITF doubles title at the Indonesia F1.

2022: ATP debut
Addison made his ATP main draw debut at the 2022 Adelaide International 2 after receiving a wildcard into the doubles main draw with Thomas Fancutt. They reached the quarter final of this event.
He reached the semi final of the M25 Canberra in February, which is his best singles result at this level.

ATP Challenger and ITF Futures/World Tennis Tour finals

Doubles: 8 (5–3)

References

External links

1995 births
Living people
Australian male tennis players
Tennis players from Melbourne
21st-century Australian people